Talib Salim Al-Maiwali (born 16 March 1951) is an Omani sailor. He competed in the 1984 Summer Olympics.

References

1951 births
Living people
Omani male sailors (sport)
Omani windsurfers
Olympic sailors of Oman
Sailors at the 1984 Summer Olympics – Windglider
Summer Olympics competitors for Oman